'Pitteurs Pendula' was listed by C. de Vos  in Handboek Supplement 16, 1890, as Ulmus pitteursii pendula. However, Hans M. Heybroek, erstwhile head of the elm breeding programme at the de Dorschkamp Research Institute for Forestry and Landscape Planning at Wageningen, Netherlands, identified the tree as Zelkova × verschaffeltii.

References

Misidentified elm cultivar
Ulmus articles missing images